Prabodhanam is a weekly Islamic magazine published in Malayalam from Kozhikode(Calicut) in Kerala, India.

History
It began as a monthly publication in 1949   but was later turned into a weekly in 1964. The magazine is officially affiliated to the Kerala Branch of Jamaat-e-Islami Hind. Prabodhanam was founded by founder leaders of Kerala Halqa of Jamaat-e-Islami Hind, V.P. Mohammed Ali (Haji Sahib) and K.C. Abdullah Moulavi. The publisher of Prabodhanam is Islamic Services Trust based in Kozhikode. Prabodhanam celebrated its sixtieth anniversary in 2009.

References

External links 
Official website of Prabodhanam Weekly

Weekly magazines published in India
Magazines established in 1949
Malayalam-language magazines
Religious magazines
Religious mass media in India
Mass media in Kerala